Silent Love may refer to:

Silent Love (1977 film), a Dutch drama film
 Silent Love (1971 film), a Shaw Brothers film
 Silent Love (1986 film), a Hong Kong film produced by Sammo Hung
A Silent Love, a 2004 Canadian film by Federico Hidalgo